The Union of Italian Jewish Communities (Italian: Unione delle comunità ebraiche italiane, UCEI) is a national association that represents over twenty Jewish community associations in Italy. It was founded in 1911 as the Comitato delle università israelitiche, which became the Consorzio delle comunità israelitiche italiane in 1920 and the Unione delle comunità israelitiche italiane in 1930. The current name was adopted in 1987.

Jewish community association locations represented by the Union

 Ferrara
 Ancona
 Casale Monferrato
 Florence 
 Genoa
 Livorno
 Mantua
 Merano
 Milan 
 Modena
 Naples
 Padua 
 Parma
 Pisa
 Rome
 Turin
 Trieste
 Venice 
 Vercelli
 Verona

Presidents
 Noemi Di Segni (from 2016)
 Renzo Gattegna (2006 to 2016)
 Amos Luzzatto (1998 to 2006)
 Tullia Zevi (1983 to 1998)
 Pietro Blayer (1976 to 1978)

References

External links
 Official Website

 
Jews and Judaism in Italy
Jewish organizations based in Italy
Jewish organizations established in 1911
1911 establishments in Italy
Judaism in Italy